Carlos Droguett (14 October 1912 – 30 July 1996) was a Chilean writer. In 1970 he won the Chilean National Prize for Literature and the Premio Alfaguara de Novela.

References

1912 births
1996 deaths
Chilean male writers
National Prize for Literature (Chile) winners